Carmen Ximena Andrade Lara (born 19 October 1954) is a Chilean sociologist who served as minister during the first government of Michelle Bachelet (2006–2010).

References

1954 births
Living people
University of Chile alumni
University of Vienna alumni
21st-century Chilean politicians
Socialist Party of Chile politicians
People from Santiago